Fagesia rudra is a small, subglobular ammonite (suborder Ammonitina) belonging to the vascoceratid family. This species lived during the Turonian stage of the late Cretaceous, 92-88 Ma ago.

References
W.J. Kennedy, C.W. Wright Vascoceratid ammonites from the type turonian
A New Ammonite Fauna of the Lower Turonian of Mexico 
Global Names

Acanthoceratoidea